Lincoln Park is a neighbourhood in the southwest quadrant of Calgary, Alberta located north of Glenmore Trail and west of Crowchild Trail. Notable landmarks in the neighbourhood include Mount Royal University and the ATCO Industrial Park. The neighbourhood is located on the section of the former Canadian Forces Base Calgary that during World War II was a Royal Canadian Air Force airfield; the name of the district derives from a small area of military housing located between 54th Avenue S.W. and Glenmore Trail which was reserved for United States Air Force members stationed at the airfield during World War II.

Demographics

Residents in this community had a median household income of $30,411 in 2000, and there were 28.9% low income residents living in the neighbourhood. As of 2000, 18.8% of the residents were immigrants. A proportion of 62.7% of the buildings were condominiums or apartments, and 62.7% of the buildings was rented. The residential sector is made up completely of rental housing.

See also
List of neighbourhoods in Calgary

References

Neighbourhoods in Calgary